Daniyar is a given name and may refer to:

Daniar
Daniar Kenzhekhanov (born 1983), Kazakhstani footballer

Daniyar
Daniyar Ismayilov (born 1992), Turkmenistani-Turkish weightlifter
Daniyar Kairov (born 1994), Kazakhi ice hockey player
Daniyar Mukanov (born 1978), Kazakhstani footballer
Daniyar Munaytbasov (born 1976), Kazakhstani boxer
Daniar Usenov (born 1960), Kyrgyz banker and politician 
Daniyar Yeleussinov (born 1991), Kazakh amateur boxer